FabricLive.93 is a DJ mix album by Canadian musician Dan Snaith, under the stage name Daphni. It was released in July 2017 as part of the FabricLive Mix Series.

Track listing

References

External links

FabricLive.93 at Fabric

Fabric (club) albums
2017 compilation albums